Carlton Livingston (born December 1954) is a Jamaican reggae vocalist, known for his 1984 hit "100 Weight of Collie Weed".

Early life 
Livingston was born in St. Mary, Jamaica. He grew up singing in church. In high school at Trenchtown Cooperative, he heard Bob Marley perform. He started a sound system "Fantastic Three" with Lone Ranger. Tony Walcott discovered the sound system and invited Livingston and Lone Ranger to record with him.

Career 
Livingston's recording career began in 1978 with his first recording at Channel One. This was the album "The Tale of Two Cities." He has recorded with producers including Coxone Dodd, Winston Riley, Sly& Robbie, Clive Jarrett, and King Jammy. Livingston gained success with his 1984 hit "100 Weight of Collie Weed." In the 1990s, he recorded "Rumors" with Shabba Ranks, produced by Bobby Digital. Livingston moved to Brooklyn in the 1980s, where he lives to this day.

Livingston's music has been covered by Gregory Isaacs, Dennis Brown, Sanchez, Carl Meeks, Shinehead and Sublime.

References

External links 
 Trodding Through the Jungle on YouTube

1962 births
Living people
20th-century Jamaican male singers
Cannabis music
Jamaican reggae singers
People from Saint Andrew Parish, Jamaica
People from Saint Ann Parish
Greensleeves Records artists